"Take Me to Your Heaven" was the winner of the Eurovision Song Contest 1999, performed in English (taking advantage of new rules removing the requirement to perform in a national language) by Charlotte Nilsson representing . Nilsson first won the Swedish Melodifestivalen 1999 when singing the Swedish-language version "Tusen och en natt" ("One Thousand and One Nights").

The song was internationally released as a single on 21 June 1999, produced by Mikael Wendt. At the singles charts, it peaked at number 2 in Sweden, number 5 in Flemish Belgium, number 10 in Norway, number 20 in the United Kingdom, and number 23 in the Netherlands.

On 24 April 1999, the Swedish-language version of the song entered radio chart Svensktoppen as number-one and spent 8 consecutive weeks on the top spot, remaining on the chart until 4 September 1999. The song was succeeded in 2000 as contest winner by the Olsen Brothers representing  with "Fly on the Wings of Love".

Content
The song is an up-beat song about love, with the singer asking her lover to take her to heaven by loving her. Some fans have argued that it is derivative of previous Swedish  winner ABBA. The music video is set in the wintertime with Charlotte walking in the snow.

Track listings
Swedish CD single
"Take Me to Your Heaven" – 3:04
"Tusen och en natt" – 3:38
"Take Me To Your Heaven" (Tocclo-Mix) – 3:24
"Take Me To Your Heaven" (The Specialist-Mix) – 4:25
"Take Me to Your Heaven" (Instrumental Version) – 3:04

UK CD single
"Take Me To Your Heaven" – 3:03
"Take Me To Your Heaven" (Club Mix – The Specialist-Mix II) – 4:16
"Take Me To Your Heaven" (RnB Mix – Tocclo-Mix) – 3:21
"Take Me To Your Heaven" (Dance Mix – The Specialist-Mix) – 4:25

UK cassette single
"Take Me to Your Heaven" – 3:00
"Take Me to Your Heaven" (Club Mix) – 4:16
"Take Me to Your Heaven" (RnB Mix) – 3:22
"Take Me to Your Heaven" (Dance Mix) – 4:22

Charts

Weekly charts

Year-end charts

References

External links
"Take Me to Your Heaven" at the Dutch singles chart
"Take Me to Your Heaven" at the Norwegian singles chart
"Take Me to Your Heaven" at the Swedish singles chart

Eurovision Song Contest winning songs
Eurovision songs of 1999
Eurovision songs of Sweden
Melodifestivalen songs of 1999
Music based on One Thousand and One Nights
Songs based on fairy tales
Songs written by Gert Lengstrand
Songs written by Lars Diedricson
Songs written by Marcos Ubeda
Charlotte Perrelli songs
Wizex songs
1999 songs